Toy Story Land (known as Toy Story Playland at Walt Disney Studios Park) is a themed land at Walt Disney Studios Park, Hong Kong Disneyland, Shanghai Disneyland, and Disney's Hollywood Studios. The area is based on the Disney·Pixar film series Toy Story.

Toy Story Land in France originally opened as part of Toon Studio on August 17, 2010, at a cost of 79 million euros. Toy Story Land in Hong Kong opened on November 17, 2011. Toy Story Land in Shanghai opened on April 26, 2018. Toy Story Land at Disney's Hollywood Studios in Florida was announced on August 15, 2015, at the D23 Expo, and opened on June 30, 2018.

Walt Disney Studios Park
During Mickey's Magical Party in 2009, information was leaked about an expansion at Walt Disney Studios Park, the resort later confirmed this. The new Pixar themed area helped promote Toy Story 3. The area is designed to "shrink the guest" down to being the size of a toy, and to play in Andy's Backyard with his toys. It had to do this through using highly immersive theming, using bamboo to act as giant blades of grass surrounding the area, the use of many themed props and characters from the Toy Story films such as a giant Buzz Lightyear, a giant Rex, an oversized paper plane and a large ball from the first Pixar short, Luxo Jr. The area also features numerous photo opportunities. Construction of the area started in late 2009 and was finished on time. The new area is located on the right side of Walt Disney Studios Park, behind the Art of Disney Animation.

Attractions and entertainment
 RC Racer
 Slinky Dog Zigzag Spin
 Toy Soldiers Parachute Drop

Former attractions and entertainment
 Green Army Men Meet & Play

Shops
 Toy Story Playland Boutique

Hong Kong Disneyland

Hong Kong Disneyland features an almost identical land, named simply Toy Story Land (Traditional Chinese: 反斗奇兵大本營). This expansion area is exclusive within Asia to Hong Kong for five years from the date of its opening. The land is themed identically; using bamboo to act as giant blades of grass surrounding the area, the use of many themed props and characters from the Toy Story films such as a giant Woody, a giant Rex, an oversized paper plane and also a large ball from the first Pixar short, Luxo Jr. The land opened on November 18, 2011. The land is located to the west side of Hong Kong Disneyland, behind Fantasyland.

On February 6, 2013, a new shop named Andy's Toy Box has been opened, next to RC Racer.

Attractions and entertainment
 Barrel of Fun
 Cubot
 RC Racer
 Slinky Dog Spin
 Toy Soldier Boot Camp
 Toy Soldiers Parachute Drop

Restaurants and refreshments
Jessie's Snack Roundup

Shops
Andy's Toy Box

Shanghai Disneyland Park

Toy Story Land was announced for the park on November 9, 2016, when Bob Iger, chairman and chief executive officer of The Walt Disney Company, along with Bob Chapek, chairman of Walt Disney Parks and Resorts, and Fan Xiping, chairman of Shanghai Shendi Group, celebrated breaking ground on the new expansion. The land opened on April 26, 2018.

Toy Story Land at Shanghai Disneyland is located between Tomorrowland and Fantasyland. The land features three attractions and a themed character greeting area.

Attractions and entertainment
 Rex's Racers
 Slinky Dog Spin
 Woody's Round-Up – an attraction similar to Mater's Junkyard Jamboree at Disney California Adventure, themed around Woody and Bullseye.

Restaurants and refreshments
 Toy Box Cafe
 The Box of Buzz Lightyear
 The Box of Lotso
 The Box of Mr. and Mrs. Potato Head

Disney's Hollywood Studios

The other attractions include a Slinky Dog themed family coaster and an attraction based around The Claw and the Little Green Aliens. Construction began on April 3, 2016, and the land opened on June 30, 2018. This edition of Toy Story Land is the largest in any Disney park in terms of area.

Attractions and entertainment
 Toy Story Mania! – a shooting dark ride where riders try to score points by hitting targets with a variety of objects inside a carnival-themed playset. The attraction was originally called Toy Story Midway Mania! and the entrance was located in Pixar Place when the ride opened in 2008, but was moved to Toy Story Land with a new entrance on the land's opening day.
 Slinky Dog Dash – a family-friendly roller coaster where riders are sent flying through Andy's backyard inside of a giant Slinky Dog. The coaster features two launches and an animatronic Wheezy, who serenades riders as their coaster enters the loading area.
 Alien Swirling Saucers – a flat ride themed around Buzz Lightyear where riders are whipped around a toy playset of outer space in a vehicle driven by one of Buzz's little green aliens. This ride uses similar ride mechanics as Mater's Junkyard Jamboree in Cars Land and Woody's Round-Up in Shanghai Disneyland's version of Toy Story Land.
 Green Army Men Drum Corps – Green Army Men play cadences on a snare drum, bass drum, and tenor drums.
 Green Army Men Boot Camp – Green Army Men invite guests to partake in various boot camp drills, games, and chants; making them honorary Green Army Men.
 Character meet & greets - Buzz Lightyear nearby the Toy Story Land marquee, Sheriff Woody and Bo Peep outside Toy Story Mania! and Jessie outside Alien Swirling Saucers.

Restaurants and refreshments
 Woody's Lunch Box – A counter-service restaurant which looks like an old-fashioned lunch box pushed up against a picture book about "Woody's Roundup," a fictional TV show seen in Toy Story 2. The restaurant is sponsored by Babybel.
 Woody's Roundup Rodeo BBQ - It was announced in 2019 that a table-service Toy Story-themed restaurant will be built with an opening date of 2020. In January 2022, the restaurant was reconfirmed to be opening, with an announced date of later in 2022. However, Disney's Hollywood Studios announced that the restaurant was delayed to March 23, 2023, as part of Walt Disney World's 50th Anniversary celebration and the Disney 100 Years of Wonder celebration.

Characters
 Woody (dressed as a superhero during Halloween)
 Buzz Lightyear (dressed as a vampire during Halloween and as Santa Claus during Christmas)
 Jessie (dressed as a clown during Halloween)
 Bo Peep (Debuted in 2019 to promote the release of Toy Story 4. Currently a seasonal meet-and-greet character)

References

External links

 Toy Story Playland at Walt Disney Studios Park (official webpage)
 Toy Story Land at Hong Kong Disneyland (official webpage)
 Toy Story Land at Disney's Hollywood Studios (official webpage)
 Disney·Pixar Toy Story Land at Shanghai Disneyland (official webpage)

 
Themed areas in Walt Disney Parks and Resorts
Walt Disney Studios Park
Hong Kong Disneyland
Shanghai Disneyland
Disney's Hollywood Studios
Proposed buildings and structures in California
2010 establishments in France
2011 establishments in Hong Kong
2018 establishments in China
2018 establishments in Florida